In 2011, Hull Kingston Rovers competed in the 16th season of the Super League and also in the 2011 Challenge Cup. Hull Kingston Rovers made the playoffs only to be knocked out by the Catalans Dragons in the first round.

2011 transfers

Ins

Outs

2011 squad
Source:

Coaching team

Fixtures and results

References

External links
Official website
East Hull is Wonderful fanzine
Unofficial Hull KR fans internet forum
Hull KR Junior Robins

Hull Kingston Rovers seasons
Hull Kingston Rovers season